Deyyam may refer to:
 Deyyam (1996 film), a Telugu horror film
 Deyyam (2021 film), an Indian Telugu-language horror film